BeXta is the performance name of Rebecca Elizabeth Poulsen, a trance and hard dance, DJ and producer. She studied classical music and music technology before turning to electronic dance music from 1992. BeXta established her own label, Mixology Digital, in 2000.

Biography 

Rebecca Elizabeth Poulsen studied at Queensland Conservatorium of Music for a Bachelor of Sonology. She started creating her own music using keyboards and computers in 1992 and started performing live as BeXta in 1993. BeXta extended her talents to DJing in 1997 and her first weekly residency was Plastic in Sydney in 1998.

In 1995 she released her first single, "Lunar Tango", on an independent label in Melbourne. She supported shows by Björk and by Prodigy. Her debut album, beXtaIsm, was issued on a music cassette in that same year. Bexta has several single releases currently, after the release of the EP - Skirmish LIVE, this was received well entering the ARIA singles charts in 1999. One album, Conversations with ones and zeroes has reached number 8 on the ARIA independent album charts in 2004.

Bexta produces the DJ compilation series, Mixology, beginning in 2000, As of 2010 there were 12 releases in this series.

BeXta has toured extensively in Australia since the late 1990s and internationally as well, including the UK, Canada, China, Indonesia, and New Zealand. She was voted Australia's number one female dj by the general public for several years in the mid 2000s, and one year was ranked number 3 DJ in Australia. She has also remixed many international dance artists, and Australian artists such as Icehouse, Vanessa Amarossi, Bonni Anderson, and the ACDC track "Thunderstruck".

Bexta is featured in "BNE - The Definitive Archive: Brisbane Independent Electronic Music Production 1979-2014", which is a hardcover book and USB music archive published by Trans:Com in September 2014.

BeXta is featured in the INTHEMIX Top 100 Australian Dance Tracks of all Time

Discography

Albums

Charting extended plays

References

External links
 bexta.com (Official site)
  (BeXta on iTunes)
  (Tunes of Trackitdown.net)
  (Podomatic Podcast)
 BeXta at Discogs
  on (BeXta on Soundcloud)

Year of birth missing (living people)
Living people
Musicians from Sydney
Club DJs
Women DJs
Australian DJs
Australian electronic musicians
Electronic dance music DJs